1937 Országos Bajnokság I (men's water polo) was the 31st water polo championship in Hungary. There were nine teams who played one-round match for the title.

Final list 

* M: Matches W: Win D: Drawn L: Lost G+: Goals earned G-: Goals got P: Point

2. Class 

1. MOVE Eger SE, 2. BBTE, 3. Tatabányai SC, 4. NSC.

Sources 
Gyarmati Dezső: Aranykor (Hérodotosz Könyvkiadó és Értékesítő Bt., Budapest, 2002.)
Magyar Sport Almanach 1937-1939

1937 in water polo
1937 in Hungarian sport
Seasons in Hungarian water polo competitions